Maynard Freeman Schurman (born July 18, 1957) is a Canadian former professional ice hockey player. He played left wing in seven National Hockey League (NHL) games with the Hartford Whalers during the 1979–80 season.

Schurman was born in Summerside, Prince Edward Island. Schurman currently owns and operates the Crystal Sports Pro Shop, located in the Fred Rust Ice Arena at the University of Delaware.

Career statistics

Regular season and playoffs

References

External links

1957 births
Living people
Canadian ice hockey left wingers
Hampton Aces players
Hartford Whalers players
Ice hockey people from Prince Edward Island
Maine Mariners players
Milwaukee Admirals (IHL) players
Mount Allison University alumni
People from Summerside, Prince Edward Island
Springfield Indians players
Undrafted National Hockey League players
Western International Hockey League players
Wichita Wind players